Klosterfrau Melissengeist, also referred to as Klostermelissen or Melissengeist, is a German variation of Carmelite Water currently sold by Klosterfrau Healthcare Group as an alternative remedy for the improvement of general health and wellbeing. Melissengeist derives its name from one of its principal ingredients, Melissa officinalis L., commonly known as lemon balm. It also includes the essential oils of thirteen medicinal plants such as gentian, cardamom, cinnamon, and ginger, which are all mixed in a 79% ethanol solution. Since its origin in the 1800s in Germany, it has been used as an alternative medicine to treat an array of health issues like colds or gastrointestinal issues.

Origin 
Klosterfrau Melissengeist was created in the 1800s in Cologne, Germany by the nun Maria Clementine Martin. It eventually became the first traditional medicinal product to be approved in the European Union. Her company Klosterfrau was founded in 1826 near Cologne Cathedral, where she distilled and refined the remedy herself. She branded her product "Real Spanish Carmelite-Melissa Water" with the image of a nun, and many vendors followed suit in hopes of copying her product.

By the end of 1829, she was given permission to print the official Prussian eagle on her products, which was a deterrent to imitators and essentially served as a copyright. By the end of her life in 1843, Klosterfrau was steadily growing and had branches in Bonn, Aachen, and Berlin.

References 

Alternative medical treatments